Aaj Robibar (Bengali: আজ রবিবার; Today's Sunday) is a Bangladeshi television sitcom created by Humayun Ahmed that was originally aired on BTV in 1997—considered one of the finest works from Humayun Ahmeds filming career. It was one of Bangladesh's most popular sitcoms of the 90's. It was re-aired in Hindi on the Indian television channel Star Plus in 2017.

Plot
The plot revolves around the day-to-day life of an eccentric household consisting of a man only called Dadajan ("grandpa"), his socially in-adept sons, two granddaughters, a boarder, the manservant and the maid.

A drama about the daily comic incidents taking place in a Dhaka household, the series' opening episode begins with Konka, the younger granddaughter who breaks the fourth wall to introduce characters and premises to the audience. She and her elder sister Titli are fun-loving girls, both secretly in love with the boarder Anis, a nerd who doesn't seem to understand social stuff and never shows affection for any of them. Their father Jamil, the middle son and an architect by profession, is fond of Hason Raja songs and after losing his wife around the time when Konka was born, falls in love with an attractive, mature and intelligent woman named Meera, whom he hires as a governess. The eldest son, Asgor is an eminent psychiatrist and also falls in love with Meera. Meanwhile, Farhad, who looks like "Baker Bhai" becomes involved with the family. Asgor, being convinced by Titli and Konka, hypnotizes Anis to induce the loving soul of him and changes him completely. Anis, then run after Titli and expresses his love for her, and seeks love in turn. In the end, Farhad goes outside with the younger brother of the house to see the miseries of the poor people of the street, and the younger brother says, he does not need not to be a Himu anymore if Farhad becomes one.

Cast
 Abul Khair as Dadajan, head of the household
 Aly Zaker as Asgor, the eldest son who is a psychiatrist
 Abul Hayat as Jamil, Dadajan's middle son who is an architect
 Asaduzzaman Noor as Farhad
 Fazlul Kabir Tuhin as the youngest son, "Himu"
 Shuja Khondokar as Prof. Khan Majlish
 Zahid Hasan as Anis, the boarder
 Suborna Mustafa as Meera
 Shila Ahmed as Konka, Titli's younger sister
 Shaon as Titli, the elder granddaughter
 Faruque Ahmed as Moti, the manservant
 Nasrin as Fuli, the maid
 Saleh Ahmed as the police O.C
 Dipak Kumar Sur as the patient of Asgor
 Shilpa

Music
Songs created by Hason Raja were used in the drama.
 Music direction, composition and music: Maksud Jamil Mintu
 Lead vocals: Selim Chowdhury
 Vocals: Fazlul Kabir Tuhin

References

Further reading
 
 
 

Bangladeshi television shows
Bangladesh Television original programming
Bengali-language television programming in Bangladesh